Canon EOS 1100D is a 12.2-megapixel digital single-lens reflex camera announced by Canon on 7 February 2011. It is known as the EOS Kiss X50 in Japan and the EOS Rebel T3 in the Americas.  The 1100D is Canon's most basic entry-level DSLR, and introduces movie mode to other entry level DSLRs. It replaced the 1000D and is also the only Canon EOS model currently in production that is not made in Japan but in Taiwan, aside from the EOS Rebel T4i.

Canon announced in February 2014 that the 1100D was replaced by the 1200D/Rebel T5.

Features
 12.2 effective megapixel APS-C CMOS sensor.
 DIGIC IV Image Processor.
 2.7-inch in color TFT LCD monitor with 230,000-dot resolution.
 Sensor Crop Factor: 1.6x
 Sensor Size : APS-C 22.2x14.7mm
 Longer battery life: 700 shots
 Less startup delay: 100 ms	
 Slightly lower noise at high ISO: 755 ISO
 Continuous Drive up to 3 frames per second for 830 JPEG frames or 2 frames per second for 5 RAW frames.
 ISO sensitivity 100–6,400.
 Canon EF/EF-S lenses.
 sRGB and Adobe RGB colour spaces
 SD, SDHC, and SDXC memory card file storage
 File formats include: JPEG, RAW (14-bit CR2).
 720p HD video at 25 or 30 fps
 Unlike many other Canon DSLRs the EOS 1100D model comes in three different body colors other than black: red, grey and brown. As of 2017 the only other Canon DSLR cameras which offer additional colors are EOS 100D and EOS 300D which are available in white.

Dials

Creative Zone
 A-DEP (Auto Depth-of-field AE): The camera automatically selects the aperture and shutter speed to keep most of the image in focus. (Only recommended in high light conditions as the camera tends to choose smaller f/stops)
 M (Manual): The camera lets you choose manually the aperture and shutter speed.
 Av (Aperture priority): The camera lets the user choose the aperture (f/) value and then automatically adjusts the shutter speed for correct exposure.
 Tv (Shutter speed priority): The camera lets the user set the shutter speed and automatically sets the aperture for correct exposure.
 P (Program AE): The camera automatically chooses an aperture and shutter combination for correct exposure and the user can change between one of these combinations.

Basic Zone
 Full Auto (represented with a green rectangle): Completely automatic shooting.
 Creative Auto: is a camera setting that's designed to aid new users in achieving good quality results without having to learn and understand all of the camera's functions and how exposure is set.
 No Flash: All automatic with no flash.
 Portrait: The camera attempts to create a more shallow depth of field to create more striking portraits.
 Landscape: For shooting landscapes and sunsets.
 Close-Up: For shooting small objects near to the camera.
 Sports: For capturing fast moving objects.
 Night Portrait: Shoots with flash and with slow shutter so that the subject is illuminated by the flash and the background (e.g. a city) is also captured naturally in the night.

Video recording
The 1100D captures 720p video, it does not have continuous auto-focus while filming video; to keep a moving subject in focus the user must either trigger the auto-focus, as when shooting stills, or manually adjust the focus while recording.

References

External links

Canon EOS 1100D Product Page at Canon USA
Canon Rebel T3 / EOS 1100D Hands-on Preview – dpreview.com

1100D
Live-preview digital cameras
Cameras introduced in 2011